World Rally Championship (also known as WRC and WRC 2001) is a rally driving game for the PlayStation 2. It is the first rallying game to be officially licensed by the FIA World Rally Championship and is based on the 2001 WRC season.

Features 
WRC features 21 drivers representing 7 teams and all 14 venues from the season. Game modes feature quick rally, single rally, championship and time trial. Each car is made from around 8000 polygons. There are also cheats that will make the game funnier (Helium Co-Driver, Psychedelic effects, Underwater view, No chassis and Low Gravity).

Reception 

World Rally Championship received "favorable" reviews according to the review aggregation website Metacritic. In Japan, where the game was ported and published by Spike on 14 March 2002, Famitsu gave it a score of 35 out of 40. GameSpot named it the second-best video game of April 2002.

See also 
List of World Rally Championship video games

References

External links 
 

2001 video games
Evolution Studios games
Multiplayer and single-player video games
PlayStation 2 games
PlayStation 2-only games
Sony Interactive Entertainment games
Video games developed in the United Kingdom
Video games set in Sweden
World Rally Championship video games